Megalorhipida pseudodefectalis is a species of moth in the genus Megalorhipida known from Argentina, Brazil, Chile, and Paraguay. Its host plants are Eupatorium betonicaeforme, Barrosoa betonicaeformis, and Senecio oleosus. Moths of this species take flight in February, March, and December and have a wingspan of 15-18 millimetres.

References

Oxyptilini
Moths described in 1989
Moths of South America